Communication between devices in a fibre channel network uses different elements of Fibre Channel standards.

Transmission words and ordered sets
All Fibre Channel communication is done in units of four 10-bit codes. This group of 4 codes is called a transmission word.

An ordered set is a transmission word that includes some combination of control (K) codes and data (D) codes.

AL_PAs
Each device has an Arbitrated Loop Physical Address (AL_PA).  These addresses are defined by an 8-bit field but must have neutral disparity as defined in the 8b/10b coding scheme. That reduces the number of possible values from 256 to 134. The 134 possible values have been divided between the fabric, FC_AL ports, and other special purposes as follows:

Meta-data
In addition to the transfer of data, it is necessary for Fibre Channel communication to include some metadata.  This allows for the setting up of links, sequence management, and other control functions.  The meta-data falls into two types, primitives which consist of a 4 character transmission word and non-data frames which are more complex structures.

Primitives
All primitives are four characters in length.  They begin with the control character K28.5, followed by three data characters.  In some primitives the three data characters are fixed, in others they can be varied to change the meaning or to act as parameters for the primitive.  In some cases the last two parameter characters are identical.

Parameters are shown in the table below in the form of their hexadecimal 8-bit values.  This is clearer than their full 10-bit (Dxx.x) form as shown in the Fibre Channel standards:

Note 1: The first parameter byte of the EOF primitive can have one of four different values (8A, 95, AA, or B5). This is done so that the EOF primitive can rebalance the disparity of the whole frame. The remaining two parameter bytes define whether the frame is ending normally, terminating the transfer, or is to be aborted due to an error.

Note 2: The Open selective replicate variant can be repeated a number of times in order to communicate with more than one destination port simultaneously.  The Open broadcast replicate variant will allow communication with all ports simultaneously.

Note 3: The SOF primitive contains a pair of control bytes (shown as cccc in the table) to designate the type of frame.

Frames
The Fibre Channel protocol transmits data in frames each of which can contain up to 2112 bytes of payload data.  The structure of a frame is shown in this table:

In addition to data frames, there are non-data frames that are used for setup and messaging purposes.  These fall into three categories: link control frames, link service frames, and extended link service frames.  The following table lists the most common ones:

Fibre Channel
Computing-related lists